Søren Nikolaj Boysen (born February 5, 1950 in Tønder) is a Danish sprint canoer who competed in the early 1970s. He was eliminated in the repechages of the C-2 1000 m event at the 1972 Summer Olympics in Munich.

References
 Sports-reference.com profile

1950 births
Canoeists at the 1972 Summer Olympics
Danish male canoeists
Living people
Olympic canoeists of Denmark
People from Tønder Municipality
Sportspeople from the Region of Southern Denmark